Thalassotalea litorea  is a bacterium from the genus of Thalassotalea which has been isolated from seashore sand from the South Sea in Korea.

References

External links
Type strain of Thalassotalea litorea at BacDive -  the Bacterial Diversity Metadatabase

 

Alteromonadales
Bacteria described in 2017